Cadmium telluride (CdTe) is a stable crystalline compound formed from cadmium and tellurium. It is mainly used as  the semiconducting material in cadmium telluride photovoltaics and an infrared optical window. It is usually sandwiched with cadmium sulfide to form a p–n junction solar PV cell.

Applications 

CdTe is used to make thin film solar cells, accounting for about 8% of all solar cells installed in 2011. They are among the lowest-cost types of solar cell, although a comparison of total installed cost depends on installation size and many other factors, and has changed rapidly from year to year. The CdTe solar cell market is dominated by First Solar. In 2011, around 2 GWp of CdTe solar cells were produced; For more details and discussion see cadmium telluride photovoltaics.

CdTe can be alloyed with mercury to make a versatile infrared detector material (HgCdTe). CdTe alloyed with a small amount of zinc makes an excellent solid-state X-ray and gamma ray detector (CdZnTe).

CdTe is used as an infrared optical material for optical windows and lenses and is proven to provide a good performance across a wide range of temperatures. An early form of CdTe for IR use was marketed under the trademarked name of Irtran-6, but this is obsolete.

CdTe is also applied for electro-optic modulators. It has the greatest electro-optic coefficient of the linear electro-optic effect among II-VI compound crystals (r41=r52=r63=6.8×10−12 m/V).

CdTe doped with chlorine is used as a radiation detector for x-rays, gamma rays, beta particles and alpha particles. CdTe can operate at room temperature allowing the construction of compact detectors for a wide variety of applications in nuclear spectroscopy. The properties that make CdTe superior for the realization of high performance gamma- and x-ray detectors are high atomic number, large bandgap and high electron mobility ~1100 cm2/V·s, which result in high intrinsic μτ (mobility-lifetime) product and therefore high degree of charge collection and excellent spectral resolution. Due to the poor charge transport properties of holes, ~100 cm2/V·s, single-carrier-sensing detector geometries are used to produce high resolution spectroscopy; these include coplanar grids, Frisch-collar detectors and small pixel detectors.

Physical properties 

Thermal expansion coefficient: 5.9×10−6/K at 293 K
Young's modulus: 52 GPa
Poisson ratio: 0.41

Optical and electronic properties 

Bulk CdTe is transparent in the infrared, from close to its band gap energy (1.5 eV at 300 K, which corresponds to infrared wavelength of about 830 nm) out to wavelengths greater than 20 µm; correspondingly, CdTe is fluorescent at 790 nm. As the size of CdTe crystals are reduced to a few nanometers or less, thus making them CdTe quantum dots, the fluorescence peak shifts through the visible range into the ultraviolet.

Chemical properties 

CdTe is insoluble in water. CdTe has a high melting point of 1041 °C with evaporation starting at 1050 °C. CdTe has a vapor pressure of zero at ambient temperatures. CdTe is more stable than its parent compounds cadmium and tellurium and most other Cd compounds, due to its high melting point and insolubility.

Cadmium telluride is commercially available as a powder, or as crystals. It can be made into nanocrystals.

Toxicology assessment

The compound CdTe has different qualities than the two elements, cadmium and tellurium, taken separately. CdTe has low acute inhalation, oral, and aquatic toxicity, and is negative in the Ames mutagenicity test. Based on notification of these results to the European Chemicals Agency (ECHA), CdTe is no longer classified as harmful if ingested nor harmful in contact with skin, and the toxicity classification to aquatic life has been reduced. Once properly and securely captured and encapsulated, CdTe used in manufacturing processes may be rendered harmless.  Current CdTe modules pass the U.S. EPA’s Toxicity Characteristic Leaching Procedure (TCLP) test, designed to assess the potential for long-term leaching of products disposed in landfills.

A document hosted by the U.S. National Institutes of Health dated 2003 discloses that:
Brookhaven National Laboratory (BNL) and the U.S. Department of Energy (DOE) are
nominating Cadmium Telluride (CdTe) for inclusion in the National Toxicology Program (NTP). This nomination is strongly supported by the National Renewable Energy Laboratory (NREL) and First Solar Inc. The material has the potential for widespread applications in photovoltaic energy generation that will involve extensive human interfaces. Hence, we consider that a definitive toxicological study of the effects of long-term exposure to CdTe is a necessity.

Researchers from the U.S. Department of Energy's Brookhaven National Laboratory have found that large-scale use of CdTe PV modules does not present any risks to health and the environment, and recycling the modules at the end of their useful life completely resolves any environmental concerns. During their operation, these modules do not produce any pollutants, and, furthermore, by displacing fossil fuels, they offer great environmental benefits. CdTe PV modules that use cadmium as a raw material appear to be more environmentally friendly than all other current uses of Cd. CdTe PV provides a sustainable purpose for the potential oversupply of cadmium in the near future. Cadmium is generated as a waste by-product of zinc refining and is generated in substantial amounts regardless of its use in PV, due to the demand for steel products.

According to the classification provided by companies to the European Chemicals Agency (ECHA) in REACH registrations, it is still harmful to aquatic life with long lasting effects.

Additionally, the classification provided by companies to ECHA notifications classifies it as very toxic to aquatic life with long lasting effects, very toxic to aquatic life, harmful if inhaled or swallowed and is harmful in contact with skin.

Availability 

At the present time, the prices of the raw materials cadmium and tellurium are a negligible proportion of the cost of CdTe solar cells and other CdTe devices. However, tellurium is a relatively rare element (1–5 parts per billion in the Earth's crust; see Abundances of the elements (data page)). Through improved material efficiency and increased PV recycling systems, the CdTe PV industry has the potential to fully rely on tellurium from recycled end-of-life modules by 2038. See Cadmium telluride photovoltaics for more information. Another study shows that CdTe PV recycling will add a significant secondary resource of Te which, in conjunction with improved material utilization, will enable a cumulative capacity of about 2 TW by 2050 and 10 TW by the end of the century.

See also 

Cadmium selenide
Cadmium telluride photovoltaics
Cadmium zinc telluride
First Solar
Mercury telluride
Mercury(II) cadmium(II) telluride
Zinc telluride

References

External links 

CdTe page on the web-site of the Institute of Solid State Physics of the Russian Academy of Sciences (html)
Optical properties University of Reading, Infrared Multilayer Laboratory
CdTe: single crystals, grown by HPVB and HPVZM techniques; windows, substrates, electrooptical modulators. Infrared transmittance spectrum. MSDS.
National Pollutant Inventory – Cadmium and compounds
MSDS at ISP optics.com (doc)
MDSD at espimetals.com (pdf)
Material Safety data Sheet on isp optics web site (MS Word doc)

Cadmium compounds
Tellurides
Photovoltaics
II-VI semiconductors
Zincblende crystal structure